The A77 road is a major road in Scotland. It runs in a southwesterly direction from the city of Glasgow, past the towns of Giffnock, Newton Mearns, Kilmarnock, Prestwick, Ayr, Girvan and Stranraer to the village of Portpatrick on the Irish Sea. It passes through the council areas of Glasgow City, East Renfrewshire, East Ayrshire, South Ayrshire and Dumfries and Galloway.

It has full trunk road status from the terminus of the M77 motorway at Fenwick to the junction with the A75 in Stranraer.  Some sections - most notably those between Turnberry and Girvan, and thereon to Ballantrae, run directly on the coastline with scenic views over the Firth of Clyde and the Irish Sea.  The section between Cairnryan and Stranraer runs on the shore of Loch Ryan.

The A77 is an important link from Glasgow to one of its two major airports, Prestwick Airport, and to the two Northern Ireland ferry terminals at Cairnryan. As a result, the road is subject to a busy mixture of commuter, tourist and heavy goods vehicle traffic which has necessitated upgrades to many sections.

History 

Bypasses for Ayr and Kilmarnock were built in the 1970s, and the M77 motorway replaced the Glasgow to Newton Mearns section in two stages, in the mid-to-late 1990s, but not without controversy as a section of the motorway was routed through Pollok Country Park.

This still left the East Ayrshire and southern East Renfrewshire stretch of the road which widely appeared in statistics as one of the most dangerous sections of road in Scotland. The majority of this section was an unsegregated, four-lane single carriageway between Kilmarnock and Newton Mearns and the lanes were narrow compared to the standard of other major roads. At several points, it was common for traffic waiting to turn right to queue in the overtaking lane. Finally, the road narrowed to only two lanes near Newton Mearns, causing long queues.

The combined result was a number of fatal crashes. The Scottish Executive took the decision to replace the entire section up to the Kilmarnock bypass with an extension of the M77 after pressure and campaigning from West Sound and West FM.  This section was built in tandem with the A726 Glasgow Southern Orbital which provided a new direct connection between the M77/A77 and East Kilbride, thus diverted most of the southbound traffic bound for the A77 away from the B764 Eaglesham Moor route, and particular removed its dangerous junction with the A77 which was the site of many fatal accidents.

Construction of the motorway was faster than usual, given the eagerness to replace the A77 after another fatal crash in June 2002 resulted in the death of Hugh Davidson, then Chief Inspector of Strathclyde Police, and the motorway was opened in April 2005. This completed a continuous dual carriageway road from Glasgow to Ayr.  The original section of the A77 between Newton Mearns and Fenwick was downgraded to a local access route, with one half of the former four lane single carriageway converted to a cycle path.

In an effort to prevent a repeat of the fatalities on the southern section of the road, July 2005 saw the A77 become host to the largest automatic speed limit enforcement system in the whole of the UK.

From 10 March 2008 a long term temporary  limit from Bogend Toll to Dutch House Roundabout was introduced, following the death in October 2006 of another police officer, Constable Kevin Lowe. This speed limit was to remain in force until new grade separated junctions were opened in 2014. It's still in force.

There have been continued efforts to improve the road in the south. Over a decade later, another such project was the Turnberry Climbing Lane which opened in 2005, has enhanced guaranteed overtaking opportunities on the single carriageway section. Another improvement opened in Autumn 2006, the upgraded Whitletts roundabout with traffic lights and spiral lanes. Climbing lanes were added at Haggstone and Drummuckloch and a  stretch was straightened north of nearby Glenapp in autumn 2008. In 2011 a  stretch was widened from Park End to Bennane.

In 2022, a bypass opened at Maybole. The bypass was constructed to the west of the town and was initially intended to open in Summer 2021. The bypass is expected to improve traffic flow and decrease traffic through Maybole's town centre.

The A77 was formerly part of the Euroroute system, and comprised route E111.

Proposed developments

Further minor improvements are planned with no dates published for:
 Ardwell to Slockenray overtaking lane 
 Dowhill to Chapeldonan realignment

References

External links

 A77 Safety Group Website
 A77 on SABRE Road Lists

Roads in Scotland
Transport in Glasgow
Transport in East Renfrewshire
Transport in East Ayrshire
Transport in Dumfries and Galloway
Giffnock
Gorbals
Govanhill and Crosshill
Newton Mearns
Kilmarnock
Prestwick
Ayr
Maybole
Girvan
Stranraer